Mt Harmukh (originally "Haramukuta") is a mountain with a peak elevation of , in Ganderbal district of Jammu and Kashmir in India. Harmukh is part of the Himalayas Range and is located between Sind River in the south and Kishanganga River in the north, rising above Gangabal Lake in the vicinity of Kashmir valley. It is mostly climbed from the northwestern side of Arin, via Kudara, Bandipore. Harmukh is considered sacred in Hinduism.

Etymology
Harmukh derives from Haramukuta, meaning "the diadem of Hara (Shiva)".

The entire region of Harmukh is also known as Ramaradhan, as it is believed that Parashurama had meditated near lakes on this mountain range.

Religious beliefs
Harmukh, with Gangbal Lake at its foot, is considered a sacred mountain by Hindus. It is also known as 'Kailash of Kashmir' According to the legend of "Hurmukhuk Gosoni", once a hermit tried to reach the summit of Harmukh to see Shiva face to face. For twelve long years, he tried to scale the summit but failed until one day he saw a Gujar descending the summit. When the Gujar approached him, the hermit enquired as to what he had seen there. The Gujar said he had been searching for a stray goat, and that while searching he saw a couple milking a cow and drinking the milk from a human skull. The couple had offered him some milk, which he refused to drink; when they departed they rubbed a little of the milk on his forehead. When the Gujar indicated the spot where the milk was rubbed, the hermit was extremely joyful and rushed to lick his forehead.

Harmukh Gangbal Yatra 
This pilgrimage takes place every year on the eve of Ganga Ashtami. The yatris begin their yatra from Naranag.

Geographical setting
thumb|Photo taken from cable car in Gulmarg showing Haramukh towering above the Great Himalayan range in the distance
Harmukh lies in the northwestern Himalayan Range. The Kashmir Valley lies to its south. Water from melting glaciers form Gangabal Lake which lies at its foot to the north east side and contribute significantly to the regional fresh-water supply, supporting irrigation through Sind River. It is notable for its local relief as it is a consistently steep pyramid, dropping sharply to the east and south, with the eastern slope the steepest.

Climbing history
The highest eastern peak  was summited by Dr Ernest Neve and Geoffrey Millais in 1899. The mountain has since become popular among climbers and mountaineers.

Climbing routes
Another trek leads from Naranag to the base of Harmukh at Gangabal Lake, but it is a steep climb at some places.

References

External links
 

Mountains of Jammu and Kashmir
Geography of Ganderbal district
Five-thousanders of the Himalayas
Tourist attractions in Ganderbal district